Ralph Franklin Schilling Jr. (July 5, 1921 – May 9, 1994) was an American football end in the National Football League (NFL) for the Washington Redskins.  Schilling also played in the All-America Football Conference (AAFC) for the Buffalo Bisons.  He attended Oklahoma City University.

References

External links

 

1921 births
1994 deaths
American football ends
Buffalo Bills (AAFC) players
Camp Peary Pirates football players
Oklahoma City Chiefs football players
Washington Redskins players
University of Texas–Pan American people
University of Oklahoma alumni
People from Morris, Oklahoma
Players of American football from Oklahoma